Juan José Luvera (born 24 November 1980) is an Argentine football manager, currently in charge of Chilean club Deportes La Serena.

Career
Born in Rosario, Santa Fe, Luvera began his career in 2001 with lowly local sides. In 2016, he moved to Peru and joined Universitario's youth setup.

On 31 May 2017, Luvera was named manager of Peruvian Segunda División side Deportivo Coopsol. He was relieved of his duties in August, and joined Chilean side Huachipato in September, to work in the club's youth categories.

On 6 January 2021, Luvera was named interim manager of Huachipato, replacing sacked Gustavo Florentín. On 26 February, he was definitely appointed manager for the 2021 campaign.

Luvera left Huachipato on a mutual consent on 17 October 2021, and was named in charge of Peruvian side Universidad San Martín the following 27 January. He left the latter on 5 April 2022, after just eight league matches.

References

External links

1982 births
Living people
Sportspeople from Rosario, Santa Fe
Argentine football managers
Huachipato managers
Chilean Primera División managers
Universidad San Martín managers
Deportes La Serena managers
Argentine expatriate football managers
Argentine expatriate sportspeople in Peru
Argentine expatriate sportspeople in Chile
Expatriate football managers in Peru
Expatriate football managers in Chile